The Band Plays On is a 1934 American drama film directed by Russell Mack and written by Bernard Schubert, Ralph Spence and Harvey Gates. The film stars Robert Young, Stuart Erwin, Leo Carrillo, Betty Furness, Ted Healy and Preston Foster. The film was released on December 21, 1934, by Metro-Goldwyn-Mayer.

Plot

Cast 
Robert Young as Tony Ferrera
Stuart Erwin as Stuffy Wilson
Leo Carrillo as Angelo
Betty Furness as Kitty O'Brien
Ted Healy as Joe O'Brien
Preston Foster as Howdy Hardy
Russell Hardie as Mike O'Brien
William Tannen as Rosy Rosenberg
Robert Livingston as Bob Stone
Norman Phillips Jr. as Stuffy as a Boy
David Durand as Tony as a Boy
Sidney Miller as Rosy as a Boy
Beaudine Anderson as Mike as a Boy
Betty Jane Graham as Kitty as a Girl
Joe Sawyer as Mr. Thomas
Henry Kolker as Professor Hackett

References

External links 
 

1934 films
American drama films
1934 drama films
Metro-Goldwyn-Mayer films
Films directed by Russell Mack
American black-and-white films
1930s English-language films
1930s American films